The following is an outline of 1993 in spaceflight.

Launches

|colspan="8"|

January
|-

|colspan="8"|

February
|-

|colspan="8"|

March
|-

|colspan="8"|

April
|-

|colspan="8"|

May
|-

|colspan="8"|

June
|-

|colspan="8"|

July
|-

|colspan="8"|

August
|-

|colspan="8"|

September
|-

|colspan="8"|

October
|-

|colspan="8"|

November
|-

|colspan="8"|

December
|-

|}

Deep Space Rendezvous

EVAs

References

Footnotes

 
Spaceflight by year